Lord Leopold Arthur Louis Mountbatten  (21 May 1889 – 23 April 1922) was a British Army officer and a descendant of the Hessian princely Battenberg family and the British Royal Family. A grandson of Queen Victoria, he was known as Prince Leopold of Battenberg from his birth until 1917, when the British Royal Family relinquished their German titles during World War I, and the Battenberg family changed their name to Mountbatten.

Early life

Prince Leopold was born on 21 May 1889. His father was Prince Henry of Battenberg, the son of Prince Alexander of Hesse and by Rhine and Julia, Princess of Battenberg. His mother was Princess Beatrice of the United Kingdom, the fifth daughter and the youngest child of Queen Victoria and Prince Albert.

As he was the product of a morganatic marriage, Prince Henry of Battenberg took his style of Prince of Battenberg from his mother, Julia von Hauke, who was created Princess of Battenberg in her own right.
 
As such, Leopold was styled as His Serene Highness Prince Leopold of Battenberg from birth. In the United Kingdom he was styled His Highness Prince Leopold of Battenberg under a Royal Warrant passed by Queen Victoria in 1886.  He was baptised at St George's Chapel, Windsor Castle on 29 June 1889. His godparents were Leopold II of Belgium (represented by the Prince of Wales), the Duke of Connaught and Strathearn (represented by Prince Albert of Schleswig-Holstein), Prince Louis of Battenberg (represented by the Marquess of Lorne), the Marchioness of Lorne, the Duchess of Albany and Princess Marie of Erbach-Schönberg. His father died of malaria in 1896.

Leopold was a haemophiliac, a condition he inherited through his mother. His maternal uncle of the same name, Prince Leopold, Duke of Albany, had died from the same condition.

Military career
Leopold was commissioned a lieutenant (supernumerary) on 16 October 1909 in the 8th Battalion of the Isle of Wight Rifles, a Territorial Force unit. On 19 October 1912, he received a regular army commission in The King's Royal Rifle Corps. During service in the First World War, he was promoted to temporary lieutenant on 15 November 1914, to lieutenant on 30 April 1915 and finally to captain on 14 September 1916.

On 7 April 1918, he was placed on the half-pay list "on account of ill-health contracted on active service." From 23 July of that year until the following 6 January, he served as an extra aide-de-camp on the staff of the War Office. He resigned his commission on 14 April 1920; at the special request of his cousin, George V, he was granted the honorary rank of major.

Relinquishment of titles

During the First World War, anti-German feeling in the United Kingdom led Leopold's first cousin, George V to change the name of the Royal House from the Germanic House of Saxe-Coburg and Gotha to the more English-sounding House of Windsor. The King also renounced all his Germanic titles for himself and all members of the British Royal Family who were British citizens.

In response to this, Leopold renounced his title, through a royal warrant from the King, dated 14 July 1917, of a Prince of Battenberg and the style His Highness and became Sir Leopold Mountbatten, by virtue of his being a Knight Grand Cross of the Royal Victorian Order. Under a further warrant in September 1917 he was granted the style and precedence of the younger son of a marquess, and became Lord Leopold Mountbatten.

Death
After being initially interred in the Royal Vault at St George's Chapel, Windsor Castle, he was buried in the Royal Burial Ground, Frogmore. A memorial tablet to him and his brother Maurice is in Winchester Cathedral. His will was sealed in London after his death in 1922. His estate was valued at £4,049 (or £160,600 in 2022 when adjusted for inflation).

Titles, styles and honours

Titles
21 May 1889 – 14 July 1917: His Highness Prince Leopold of Battenberg
14 July – 11 September 1917: Sir Leopold Mountbatten
11 September 1917 – 23 April 1922: Lord Leopold Mountbatten

Honours
KCVO: Knight Commander of the Royal Victorian Order, 19 June 1911
GCVO: Knight Grand Cross of the Royal Victorian Order, 1 January 1915
Foreign
: Knight Grand Cross of the Order of Charles III, 27 May 1906

Ancestry

References

1889 births
1922 deaths
Burials in Berkshire
Military personnel from Berkshire
19th-century British people
20th-century British people
Alumni of Magdalene College, Cambridge
Leopold
British Army personnel of World War I
British people of German descent
Burials at the Royal Burial Ground, Frogmore
Freemasons of the United Grand Lodge of England
German princes
Haemophilia in European royalty
King's Royal Rifle Corps officers
Knights Grand Cross of the Royal Victorian Order
Leopold
People from Windsor, Berkshire
Younger sons of marquesses
Royal reburials